Jigalong is a remote Aboriginal community of approximately 333 people located in the Pilbara region of Western Australia.

Location
The community is located in an Aboriginal Lands Trust reserve on the western edge of the Little Sandy Desert. The traditional owners of the land are the Martu people, represented by the Western Desert Lands Aboriginal Corporation.

Demographics and facilities
The 2016 Australian census recorded the population of Jigalong as 333 people, of whom 87% were Aboriginal.

The Jigalong Remote Community School provides education from kindergarten to Year 12 level, with six teachers for a student enrolment of around 120 children.

The community has a medical centre run by the Puntukurnu Aboriginal Medical Services, but patients with serious illnesses and injuries are usually flown to Port Hedland— north west of Jigalong—by the Royal Flying Doctor Service.

In 2019, the Army Aboriginal Community Assistance Program, a joint project between National Indigenous Australians Agency (formerly the Department of Prime Minister and Cabinet) and the Australian Army, commissioned the creation of a community-owned youth centre, and facilitated the development of an outdoor barbecue setting, creek culvert and public amenities block.

The community also hosts a range of stakeholder facilities, including a BHP construction shed, and a women's centre run by Ashburton Aboriginal Corporation.

History
Jigalong was established in 1907, as the location for a maintenance and rations store for workmen constructing the rabbit-proof fence. In the 1930s, it was used as a camel-breeding site, but this use was abandoned once the motor car superseded the camel as a mode of transport. In 1947, the land was granted to the Apostolic Church, which used it as a Christian mission, and set up the Aboriginal community. The land was returned to the Australian government in 1969 as an Aboriginal reserve, and was granted to the Martu people in 1974.

Native title
The community is covered by the registered Nyiyaparli Title claim (WC05/6).

Town planning
Jigalong Layout Plan No.2 was prepared in accordance with State Planning Policy 3.2 Aboriginal Settlements, and was endorsed by the community in 2005 and the Western Australian Planning Commission in 2006.

In popular culture
Jigalong was the home of Molly Craig, a young Aboriginal girl whose  trek with her sister Daisy from the Moore River Native Settlement back to Jigalong was described in the book Follow the Rabbit-Proof Fence by Molly's daughter Doris Pilkington Garimara. In 2002, the book was made into a film, Rabbit-Proof Fence, directed by Phillip Noyce, and the film's world premiere was held in the town.

References

Towns in Western Australia
Shire of East Pilbara
Aboriginal communities in Pilbara
1907 establishments in Australia
Populated places established in 1907